The term locally finite has a number of different meanings in mathematics:

Locally finite collection of sets in a topological space
Locally finite group
Locally finite measure
Locally finite operator in linear algebra
Locally finite poset
Locally finite space, a topological space in which each point has a finite neighborhood
Locally finite variety in the sense of universal algebra